Roby railway station serves the village of Roby, Merseyside, England. It is operated by Northern Trains, as part of Merseytravel's electrified City Line to Manchester and Wigan North Western.

History
Roby station was opened in 1830 as part of the Liverpool and Manchester Railway, and is one of the oldest passenger railway stations in the world. These early intermediate stations were often little more than halts, usually positioned where the railway was crossed by a road or turnpike. This probably accounts for variations in the names of these stopping places, Roby station was originally known as Roby Lane Gate, or just Roby Gate before finally becoming Roby at an unknown date.
Originally Roby station had four platforms, but the two platforms on the northern side of the station (Platforms 3 and 4) were closed in the 1970s, and the track was lifted. As part of the electrification of the Liverpool-Manchester Line, Platforms 3 and 4 have been re-instated.  The station has also received new customer information screens and a P.A system as part of this work.

Facilities
It is staffed throughout the day (as is the norm for Merseytravel-sponsored stations), with the ticket office (located in the main building on platform one) open from 05:30 until 00:10 Mondays to Saturdays and 09:45 to 17:45 on Sundays.  Shelters are available on the other three platforms, along with digital information screens, timetable poster boards, automatic train announcements and customer help points.  Full step-free access is offered to the platforms (to 2, 3 and 4 via lifts).

Services
During the daytime, Monday to Saturday, the station is served by four trains per hour in each direction. All Westbound trains run to Liverpool Lime Street.

For many years, Roby was closed on Sundays. However, from December 2006, the station gained a Sunday service, with two trains per hour to Liverpool, one train per hour to Manchester and one train per hour to Blackpool North via Wigan.  A second hourly stopping service to and from Wigan began at the spring 2018 timetable change.

Gallery

References

External links

Railway stations in the Metropolitan Borough of Knowsley
DfT Category E stations
Former London and North Western Railway stations
Railway stations in Great Britain opened in 1830
Northern franchise railway stations
1830 establishments in England